Dansereau is a surname. Notable people with the surname include:

Alain Dansereau (born 1954), Canadian fencer
Fernand Dansereau (born 1928),  Canadian film director and film producer
Georges Dansereau (1867–1934), Canadian provincial politician
Georges-Étienne Dansereau (1898–1959), Canadian politician
Madeleine Dansereau (1922–1991), Canadian artist and educator
Mireille Dansereau (born 1943), Canadian director and screenwriter
Pierre Dansereau (1911–2011), Canadian ecologist

References